The Digges-Sasscer house is an historic building in Upper Marlboro, Maryland. It has been home to Lansdale Ghiselin Sasscer, Lansdale Ghiselin Sasscer, Jr. and Daniel Carroll Digges. The house has been documented by the Historic American Buildings Survey and is listed in the Maryland Historical Trust.

The earliest sections of the house date to the late 1700s.

References

External links

Houses in Prince George's County, Maryland
Buildings and structures in Prince George's County, Maryland
Landmarks in Maryland
Historic American Buildings Survey in Maryland